The 1900 United States presidential election in Massachusetts took place on November 6, 1900, as part of the 1900 United States presidential election. Voters chose 15 representatives, or electors to the Electoral College, who voted for president and vice president.

Massachusetts overwhelmingly voted for the Republican nominee, President William McKinley, over the Democratic nominee, former U.S. Representative and 1896 Democratic presidential nominee William Jennings Bryan. McKinley won Massachusetts by a margin of 19.74% in this rematch of the 1896 presidential election. The return of economic prosperity and recent victory in the Spanish–American War helped McKinley to score a decisive victory.

McKinley was able to win 13 out of the 14 counties in the state of Massachusetts. The only county that went to Bryan was Suffolk County, home to the state's capital and largest city, Boston. Bryan had previously lost the county to McKinley in 1896 and would lose it again to William Howard Taft in 1908.

Results

See also
 United States presidential elections in Massachusetts

References

Massachusetts
1900
1900 Massachusetts elections